Midlands 5 East (North) was a level 10 English Rugby Union league and level 5 of the Midlands League, made up of teams from the northern part of the East Midlands region including Derbyshire, Lincolnshire, Nottinghamshire and the occasional team from Leicestershire, with home and away matches played throughout the season.

Formed in 2006, the league was originally split into 2 regional divisions – Midlands 6 East (North-East) and Midlands 6 East (North-West) - but, by the 2009-10 season, the league merged into a single division. Promoted teams typically moved up to Midlands 4 East (North) and there is no relegation due to it being one of the basement divisions for Midlands rugby. At the end of the 2017-18 season the division was abolished with the majority of teams moving up into Midlands 4 East (North).

2017–18

Participating teams & locations

Teams 2016-17
Bingham
Cleethorpes (relegated from Midlands 4 East (North))
Gainsborough
Keyworth 
North Hykeham (relegated from Midlands 4 East (North))
Nottinghamians
Skegness (relegated from Midlands 4 East (North))
Woodhouse Giants

Teams 2015-16
Barton & District
Bingham (relegated from Midlands 4 East (North))
Creswell Crusaders
Gainsborough
Keyworth (relegated from Midlands 4 East (North))
Meden Vale
Nottinghamians
Ollerton
Skegness (relegated from Midlands 4 East (North))
Woodhouse Giants

Teams 2014-15
Barton & District	
Birstall	
Creswell Crusaders	
Gainsborough	
Leesbrook (relegated from Midlands 4 East (North))
Meden Vale
North Hykeham
Nottinghamians (relegated from Midlands 4 East (North))
Ollerton
Woodhouse Giants

Teams 2013-14
Birstall
Creswell Crusaders	
Gainsborough	
Horncastle (relegated from Midlands 4 East (North))
Meden Vale
North Hykeham
Nottingham Corsairs
Ollerton
Rolls-Royce
Sileby Town
Woodhouse Giants

Teams 2012–13
Bingham
Castle Donington
Creswell Crusaders
East Leake
Leesbrook
Meden Vale
North Hykehan
Ollerton
Rolls-Royce

Teams 2008–09
Belper
Castle Donington
Chesterfield Panthers
East Leake
East Retford
Leesbrook 
Melbourne
Nottinghamians
Rolls-Royce
Worksop

Teams 2007–08
Barton & District 
Chesterfield Pythons
Dronfield
East Leake
East Retford
Melbourne 
Nottingham Casuals
Nottinghamians
Rolls-Royce
University Of Derby

Original teams

When this division was introduced in 2006 it was split into two separate divisions - Midlands 6 East (North-East) and Midlands 6 East (North-West) - containing the following teams:

Midlands 6 East (North-East)
Barton & District – N/A (new to league)
Bourne - transferred from Nottinghamshire/Lincolnshire (7th)
Cleethorpes - transferred from Nottinghamshire/Lincolnshire (2nd)
Gainsborough - transferred from Nottinghamshire/Lincolnshire (9th)
Horncastle – N/A (new to league)
North Hykeham – N/A (new to league)
Nottingham Corsairs - transferred from Nottinghamshire/Lincolnshire (3rd)
Ollerton - transferred from Nottinghamshire/Lincolnshire (5th)
Skegness - transferred from Nottinghamshire/Lincolnshire (4th)

Midlands 6 East (North-West)
All Spartans Old Boys
Belper - transferred from Derbyshire/North Leicestershire (4th)
Buxton – relegated from Notts, Lincs & Derbyshire/North Leicestershire (10th)
Chesterfield Panthers (2nd XV) – N/A (new to league)
Leesbrook - transferred from Derbyshire/North Leicestershire (7th)
Meden Vale - transferred from Nottinghamshire/Lincolnshire (6th)
Melbourne - transferred from Derbyshire/North Leicestershire (6th)
Rolls-Royce - transferred from Derbyshire/North Leicestershire (5th)
Tupton - transferred from Derbyshire/North Leicestershire (8th)
Uttoxeter - transferred from Derbyshire/North Leicestershire (3rd)

Midlands 5 East (North) honours

Midlands 6 East (North-East) / (North-West) / South (2006–2009)

The league was originally divided into two sub-divisions known as Midlands 6 East (North-East) and Midlands 6 East (North-West). These divisions were introduced along with their counterpart Midlands 6 East (South) at tier 10 to replace the discontinued East Midlands/South Leicestershire 2, Derbyshire/North Leicestershire, Nottinghamshire/Lincolnshire leagues. Promotion was to Midlands 5 East (North) and there was no relegation.

Midlands 5 East (North) (2009–present)

Midlands 6 East (North-East / North-West) were remerged into a single division ahead of the 2009–10 season known as Midlands 5 East (North), which remained a tier 10 league along with its counterpart Midlands 5 East (South) (formerly Midlands 6 East (South)). Promotion was now to Midlands 4 East (North) (formerly the old Midlands 5 East (North)) and there was no relegation. The league was discontinued at the end of the 2017–18 season.

Promotion play-offs

Between 2008 and 2009 there was a promotion playoff between the runners-up of Midlands 5 East (North-East) and Midlands 5 East (North-West) for the third and final promotion place to Midlands 4 West (North), with the team with the superior league record having home advantage in the tie. The playoffs were dissolved at the end of the 2008-09 season when Midlands 5 East (North) became one division. By the end of the promotion play-offs the Midlands 5 East (North-West) teams won all both playoff games and the home team has also won promotion both times.

Number of league titles

Cleethorpes (2)
Barton & District (1)
Belper (1)
Bingham (1)
Birstall (1)
Boston (1)
Long Eaton (1)
Melbourne (1)
Ollerton (1)
Sileby Town (1)
Skegness (1)
Tupton (1)
Uttoxeter (1)
Worksop (1)

See also
Leicestershire RU
Notts, Lincs & Derbyshire RFU
English rugby union system
Rugby union in England

Notes

References

6